Tenkasi is a town and headquarters of the Tenkasi district in Indian state of Tamil Nadu.

Being one of the most significant spiritual and cultural places in South Tamilnadu,Tenkasi houses The Kutraleeshwarar temple (Chitra Sabha), one of the five sabhas of Lord Nataraja, an incarnation of Lord Shiva. Tamil poet Thirikooda Rasappa Kavirayar describes this temple in his poem as “Kutrala Kuravanji” which means 'beauty of Kutralam'. the city also houses the famous TenKasi Viswanathar temple, Sankarankoil temple and Ilangi Kumarar temple.

Etymology 
Tenkasi in South Indian languages means South Kashi(Then+Kashi). As name goes, Tenkasi is situated in the Southern India and home to ThenKasi Viswanathar Temple.

Demographics 

According to 2011 census, Tenkasi had a population of 70,545 with a sex-ratio of 1,020 females for every 1,000 males, much above the national average of 929. A total of 7,413 were under the age of six, constituting 3,774 males and 3,639 females. Scheduled Castes and Scheduled Tribes accounted for 14.16% and 0.47% of the population respectively. The average literacy of the town was 78.49%, compared to the national average of 72.99%. The town had a total of 17,887 households. There were a total of 27,885 workers, comprising 279 cultivators, 2,006 main agricultural labourers, 3,332 in house hold industries, 19,903 other workers, 2,365 marginal workers, 28 marginal cultivators, 90 marginal agricultural labourers, 494 marginal workers in household industries and 1,753 other marginal workers.

As per the religious census of 2011, Tenkasi had 64% Hindus, 34.18% Muslims, 2.7% Christians.

History 
The Kasi Viswanathar Temple, Tenkasi was built in 1467 AD by Parakirama Pandian, Tenkasi is the last capital of the Pandya dynasty. The iconic temple is situated in the banks of Seevalaperi Pond.

Geography

It has an average elevation of 143 metres (469 ft). The town is surrounded by the Western Ghats in three sides and lies on the Tirunelveli to Kollam and Madurai to Kollam highways. The Chittar river flows through the city.

Politics
Tenkasi (state assembly constituency) is part of Tenkasi Lok Sabha constituency.
The seat is reserved for scheduled castes.
 
Palani Nadar S from INC is the Member of the Legislative Assembly (MLA) from Tenkasi since 2021.

Dhanush M. Kumar from DMK party of the UPA is the Member of Parliament (MP) - Lok Sabha since 2019.

Transportation

Rail Connectivity 

Tenkasi city is served by two Railway stations. Tenkasi Junction railway station for Express and Passenger trains.Trains are available to Chennai, Madurai, Kollam, Punalur , Shenkottai, Tirunelveli and Palakkad from here daily. And Kizha Puliyur station for Passengers trains.

Three Broad Gauge , Single - Diesel railway line, originate from this station.

 Tenkasi Junction - Kollam Junction  line
Tenkasi Junction - Tirunelveli Junction line
Tenkasi Junction - Virudunagar Junction line

Air connectivity
The nearest airports are as follows:-
 Thoothukudi Airport
 Trivandrum International Airport
 Madurai International Airport
Tiruchirappalli International Airport (297 kilometres or 185 miles)

Villages
 

Kurumbalapperi
Piranoor

References

Cities and towns in Tenkasi district